Freed may refer to:

People
 Alan Freed (1921–1965), American radio personality
 Arthur Freed (1894–1973), American film producer and lyricist
 Dan Freed (born 1959), American mathematician
 Gene Freed (1930–2009), American bridge player
 James Ingo Freed (1930–2005), German-American architect
 Leonard Freed (1929–2006), American photographer
 Richard Freed (born 1928), American music critic

Media
Jio Freed, a character in O-Parts Hunter
The Freed Man, 1989 Sebadoh album 
"Freed", a song by Tracy Bonham, from her album Down Here
Freed: Fifty Shades Freed as Told by Christian, 2021 novel by E. L. James

Other
Freed, West Virginia
 Freed of London, a specialist manufacturer of dance shoes and clothing
 Honda Freed, a Mini MPV vehicle made by Honda
Freedman, a former slave who has been released from slavery

See also

 
 
 Free (disambiguation)
 Freedom (disambiguation)
 Freeman (disambiguation)